These are the results for the 35th edition of the Ronde van Nederland cycling race, which was held from August 22 to August 26, 1995. The race started in Haarlem (North Holland) and finished in Valkenburg (Limburg). Axel Kuhlmann, the fastest cyclist of the tour, was looking into a bright future those days.

Stages

22-08-1995: Haarlem-Breda, 216 km

23-08-1995: Zaltbommel-Deventer, 164.8 km

24-08-1995: Deventer-Denekamp, 104 km

24-08-1995: Denekamp-Oldenzaal (Time Trial), 21.3 km

25-08-1995: Doetinchem-Venlo, 181.3 km

26-08-1995: Venlo-Valkenburg, 207.7 km

Final classification

External links
Wielersite Results

Ronde van Nederland
1995 in road cycling
1995 in Dutch sport